HHE may refer to:
 Haywards Heath railway station, a railway station in Sussex, England
 Health Hazard Evaluation Program, in the United States
 Heli Holland, a Dutch helicopter operator
 Helium hydride ion (HHe+)
 Hhe, a proposed gender-neutral pronoun for English
 Historic Hotels of Europe
 Home and Hospital Education (HHE) for students with a medical condition.
 Hypotonic-hyporesponsive episode an adverse reaction to vaccination.